Tahlulah Tillett (born 30 August 1998) is an Australian professional rugby league footballer. She previously played for the Newcastle Knights in the NRL Women's Premiership.

Background
Tillett was born in Cairns, Queensland and is of Torres Strait Islander descent. She played touch football in her junior years, representing Queensland and Australia, as well as junior rugby league for the Cairns Kangaroos.

Playing career

Early years
In 2017, Tillett represented the North Queensland Marlins women's team and Indigenous All Stars women's team. In 2018, she was named in the Australian women's national elite training squad for the upcoming NRLW competition. Three weeks later she played for the Wests Panthers, before rupturing the ACL in her right knee during her first game. In January 2020, she was a part of the Queensland Female Performance Program squad. In 2021, she played for the North Queensland Gold Stars in the BHP Premiership. In December 2021, she signed with the Newcastle Knights to be a part of their inaugural NRLW squad.

2022
In February, Tillett played for the Indigenous All Stars against the Māori All Stars. In round 1 of the delayed 2021 NRL Women's season, she made her NRLW debut for the Knights against the Parramatta Eels. She played in 4 matches for the Knights, before parting ways with the club at the end of the season.

References

External links
Newcastle Knights profile

1998 births
Australian female rugby league players
Indigenous Australian rugby league players
Newcastle Knights (NRLW) players
Rugby league halfbacks
Rugby league five-eighths
Living people